The 2003 Hopman Cup (also known as the Hyundai Hopman Cup for sponsorship reasons) was the 15th edition of the Hopman Cup tennis sporting event, held on 28 December 2002 through 4 January 2003 at the Burswood Entertainment Complex in Perth, Western Australia. The champions are Serena Williams and James Blake of the United States, who defeated Alicia Molik and Lleyton Hewitt of Australia in the final.

Play-off

Uzbekistan vs. Paraguay

Champion's Group

Teams and standings
 – Kim Clijsters and Xavier Malisse (Round robin win–loss: 2–1; match win–loss: 6–3)
 – Virginia Ruano Pascual and Tommy Robredo (Round robin win–loss 1–2; match win–loss: 3–6)
 – Rossana de los Ríos and Ramón Delgado (Round robin win–loss: 0–1; match win–loss: 1–2)
 – Serena Williams and James Blake (Round robin win–loss: 3–0; match win–loss: 8–1)
 – Iroda Tulyaganova and Oleg Ogorodov (Round robin win–loss: 1–3; match win–loss: 3–9)

Belgium vs. Spain

United States vs. Uzbekistan

United States vs. Spain

Belgium vs. Uzbekistan

Spain vs. Uzbekistan

United States vs. Belgium

Finalist's Group

Teams and seedings
 – Alicia Molik and Lleyton Hewitt (Round robin record: 3–0; win–loss record: 8–1)
 – Dája Bedáňová and Jiří Novák (Round robin record: 2–1; 5–4)
 – Silvia Farina Elia and Davide Sanguinetti (Round robin record: 0–3; match win–loss record: 1–8)
 – Daniela Hantuchová and Dominik Hrbatý (Round robin record: 1–2; match win–loss record: 4–5)

Australia vs. Italy

Czech Republic vs. Slovakia

Australia vs. Slovakia

Czech Republic vs. Italy

Australia vs. Czech Republic

Slovakia vs. Italy

Final

United States vs. Australia

External links

2003 Hopman Cup Article from the ITF

2003
Hopman Cup